The St. Francis DeSales Roman Catholic Church (Church of St. Francis de Sales) is a historic church building at 116 S. 6th Street in Paducah, Kentucky.  It was built in 1899 and, together with its 1927-built rectory, was added to the National Register of Historic Places in 1979.

It is a Classical Revival-style building named for St. Francis de Sales.

References

Roman Catholic churches in Kentucky
Churches on the National Register of Historic Places in Kentucky
Neoclassical architecture in Kentucky
Roman Catholic churches completed in 1899
19th-century Roman Catholic church buildings in the United States
Churches in McCracken County, Kentucky
Buildings and structures in Paducah, Kentucky
National Register of Historic Places in McCracken County, Kentucky
1899 establishments in Kentucky
Roman Catholic Diocese of Owensboro
Neoclassical church buildings in the United States